José N. Martínez Garza (born 17 December 1901, date of death unknown) was a Mexican sprinter. He competed in the men's 200 metres at the 1924 Summer Olympics.

References

External links
 

1901 births
Year of death missing
Place of birth missing
Mexican male sprinters
Olympic athletes of Mexico
Athletes (track and field) at the 1924 Summer Olympics
20th-century Mexican people